was a Japanese novelist, poet, illustrator, manga artist, songwriter, and assistant professor of Shirayuri College. He has written more than 300 books.

Biography

Funazaki was born to a wealthy family in Tokyo. After graduating from Gakushuin University in 1968, he worked as a songwriter, screenwriter, and illustrator while working in a real estate company. In 1969, while he had leave of absence, he and Yasuko Funazaki, his wife, started to write a nonsense tale, . In 1971, he resigned from the company and made his debut as a novelist.

In 1973, he wrote . The next year, the second novel of this series,  won .

His autobiographical  won  in 1975, and was selected as "Honor List" of Hans Christian Andersen Award in 1976 respectively. In 1976,  was nominated for the Graphic Award at the Bologna International Book Fair.

In 1983,  won Sankei Jidō Shuppan Bunka Shō. In 1984,  won . In 1986,  won Sankei Jidō Shuppan Bunka Shō.

In 1989, Poppen Sensei series won .

Funazaki died on October 15, 2015 at the age of 70 in Mitaka, Tokyo.

Detective Conan investigation
Around 1996, Funazaki was informed by a reader that Detective Conan, had similarities to Picasso-kun no tantei note. Funazaki checked Detective Conan and "verified close resemblances." Funazaki considered "these resemble points has possibility of coincidence," so he contacted Shogakukan. Funazaki was told, "The creator (Gosho Aoyama) might not have read Picasso-kun no tantei note. But I can't deny the possibility that one of his staff members was amused at the situation of Picasso-kun no tantei note and suggested as an idea." (Funazaki had not read any other volume except the first, because he considered that "It is ridiculous that he gave the royalties from Conan books to Gosho Aoyama.") Later, he wrote about this inquiry process in the quarterly magazine Parolu, where he declared, "There is no responsibility (責任の所在がない)," "I'll fall into evil way (グレてやる)".

Funazaki was offended at the response, and he published the third book as a protest against Aoyama.

Bibliography

Professor Poppen Series
1973 Poppen Sensei no Nichiyōbi (ぽっぺん先生の日曜日) Chikuma Shobo, Tokyo, 
1974 Poppen Sensei to Kaerazu no Numa (ぽっぺん先生と帰らずの沼) Chikuma Shobo, Tokyo, 
1976 Poppen Sensei to Waraukamomegō (ぽっぺん先生と笑うカモメ号) Chikuma Shobo, Tokyo, 
1977 Poppen Sensei to Doro no Ōji (ぽっぺん先生とどろの王子) Chikuma Shobo, Tokyo, 
1979 Poppen Sensei no Dōbutsu Jiten (ぽっぺん先生の動物事典) Chikuma Shobo, Tokyo, 
1983 Poppen Sensei Jigoku he Yōkoso (ぽっぺん先生地獄へようこそ) Chikuma Shobo, Tokyo, 
1988 Poppen Sensei to Hoshi no Joō (ぽっぺん先生と鏡の女王) Chikuma Shobo, Tokyo, 
1991 Poppen Sensei to Hoshi no Hakobune (ぽっぺん先生と星の箱舟) Chikuma Shobo, Tokyo, 
1994 Poppen Sensei no Christmas (ぽっぺん先生のクリスマス) Chikuma Shobo, Tokyo,

Picasso-kun Series
 is a fictional character in a series of Japanese children's booksPicasso-kun no tantei note(Picasso's case file) created by Funazaki. He himself illustrated these books.

He is a sixth grader at Sakuramachi Elementary School and looks like an ordinary schoolboy, but his actual age is 23. Ten years prior, he was severely wounded while he was playing baseball; he then physically stopped growing, so he appears to be an ordinary kid but is mentally older.

After his injury his father, a diplomat, took him to England. While being raised there, he became a Sherlock Holmes admirer. After returning to Japan, he came back to the elementary school, and established a detective office. He wears glasses, long boots, a suit and a tie.(But, these similarities Funazaki described are all extremely common s in manga. For example, The motif of little detective who wears suit and tie (bow tie) is used by Osamu Tezuka, Mitsuteru Yokoyama, Fujiko Fujio.)
His circumstances are well known by society. So he is allowed to drink alcoholic drinks and smoke a cigar. And he has a driver's license.

1983 Picasso-kun no tantei chō(Picasso's case file) (ピカソ君の探偵帳) Fukuinkan Shoten, Tokyo, 
1994 Picasso-kun no tantei note (ピカソ君の探偵ノート) [retitled] Parol-sha, Tokyo, 
1995 The macaroni au gratin murder case (マカロニグラタン殺人事件) Parol-sha, Tokyo, 
2000 The great baseball player murder plan (大リーガー殺人計画) Parol-sha, Tokyo,

References

External links
J'Lit | Authors : Yoshihiko Funazaki | Books from Japan 
A review of "The great baseball player murder plan" on Sankei Shimbun 
A review about Funazaki 
 Yoshihiko Funazaki manga at Media Arts Database 

1945 births
2015 deaths
20th-century Japanese novelists
21st-century Japanese novelists
Japanese poets
Japanese illustrators
Japanese songwriters
Musicians from Tokyo